The Soul Society is the debut album by bassist and cellist Sam Jones featuring performances recorded in early 1960 and originally released on the Riverside label.

Reception

Scott Yanow of Allmusic says, "all eight selections are memorable on this highly recommended disc".

Track listing
 "Some Kinda Mean" (Keter Betts) - 5:49  
 "All Members" (Jimmy Heath) - 4:11  
 "The Old Country" (Curtis Lewis, Nat Adderley) - 6:05  
 "Just Friends" (John Klenner, Sam M. Lewis) - 4:13  
 "Home" (Cannonball Adderley) - 5:13  
 "Deep Blue Cello" (Sam Jones) - 4:57  
 "There Is No Greater Love" (Isham Jones, Marty Symes) - 3:41  
 "So Tired" (Bobby Timmons) - 6:17

Personnel
Sam Jones - bass (tracks 2, 3, 5 & 8), cello (tracks 1, 4, 6 & 7)
Nat Adderley - cornet (tracks 1, 4, 6 & 7)
Blue Mitchell - trumpet (tracks 2, 3, 5 & 8)
Jimmy Heath - tenor saxophone 
Charles Davis - baritone saxophone 
Bobby Timmons - piano
Keter Betts - bass (tracks 1, 4, 6 & 7)
Louis Hayes - drums

References 

Riverside Records albums
Sam Jones (musician) albums
1960 debut albums
Albums produced by Orrin Keepnews